Speare is a surname. Notable people with the surname include:

Elizabeth George Speare (1908–1994), American children's author
Frank Palmer Speare (1869–1954), the first president of Northeastern University
Jamie Speare (born 1976), English footballer playing as a goalkeeper
Paul Speare (born 1955), former member of Dexys Midnight Runners, The TKO Horns and The Expresso Bongo Orchestra
Sally Speare Lutyens (1927–2005), composer, author, and librettist

See also
Jack Speare Park
Shakespeare
Spear (disambiguation)
Sphere (disambiguation)